Sinfonia is a 1968 Columbia Records recording of Luciano Berio conducting the New York Philharmonic and The Swingle Singers in the premiere of his four-movement "Sinfonia."  The composer would later add a fifth movement.

In 1984, the London-based "New Swingle Singers" recorded the same work (with an added fifth movement) with the Orchestre National de France conducted by Pierre Boulez (Erato).

Track listing
Side 1: "Sinfonia (Beginning)"
Section I – 6:31
Section II – 4:47
Side 2: "Sinfonia (Conclusion)"
Section III – 12:21
Section IV – 2:58

Personnel
Luciano Berio – conductor, composer
The New York Philharmonic
The Swingle Singers, as introduced:
Christiane Legrand – first soprano
Jeanette Baucomont - second soprano
Claudine Meunier – first contralto
Hélène Devos – second contralto
Joseph Noves – first tenor
Ward Swingle – second tenor
José Germain – first bass
Jean Cussac – second bass

References / external links

Columbia Records MS 7268

The Swingle Singers albums
1969 albums
French-language albums
Columbia Records albums
Albums conducted by Luciano Berio